Church of the Visitation of the Blessed Virgin Mary is a catholic church located in Voćin, Croatia.

Background
The church was originally built in 1464 by the Franciscan friars as monastery church of All Saints. During the Ottoman invasion in 16th and 17th century the church was let to ruin. It underwent a renovation during the 18th century when it was consecrated to the Visitation of the Blessed Virgin Mary. During the World War II the church was burned, and because of the Communist government it was not rebuild until 1984. Not long after, in 1991 during the Croatian War of Independence it was almost complexity destroyed by the Serb paramilitary group White Eagles that occupied Voćin. The church was rebuild again and consecrated in 2011 by the bishop Antun Škvorčević.

In 2022 the church received a title of the minor basilica.

References

Basilica churches in Croatia
Buildings and structures completed in 1464
Minor basilicas